Maggiolo is an Italian surname. Notable people with the surname include:
Lorenzo Maggiolo (1440-1501), Italian philosopher
Visconte Maggiolo (1478–1530), Italian cartographer and sailor
Eduardo Maggiolo (born 1944), Argentine sport wrestler
Elisa Maggiolo (born 1980), Argentine chess player
Ezequiel Maggiolo (born 1977), Argentine footballer
Marcio Veloz Maggiolo (1936–2021), Dominican writer, archaeologist and anthropologist

Italian-language surnames